Men Don't Cry is a 2017 Bosnian drama film directed by Alen Drljević. It was selected as the Bosnian entry for the Best Foreign Language Film at the 90th Academy Awards, but it was not nominated. The film won the 2017 Special Jury Prize at the 52nd Karlovy Vary International Film Festival.

Plot
A group of disparate, middle-aged Yugoslav War veterans talk in an extended group-therapy session.

Cast
 Boris Isaković as Miki
 Leon Lučev as Valentin
 Emir Hadžihafizbegović as Merim
 Ermin Bravo as Ahmed
 Ivo Gregurević as Josip
 Sebastian Cavazza as Ivan
 Izudin Bajrović as receptionist

See also
 List of submissions to the 90th Academy Awards for Best Foreign Language Film
 List of Bosnian submissions for the Academy Award for Best Foreign Language Film

References

External links
 

2017 films
2017 drama films
Bosnia and Herzegovina war drama films
Bosnian-language films
Films about veterans
Films about military personnel
Yugoslav Wars films